Coops is a surname. Notable people with this name include:

 Jeans Coops, Belgian bobsledder who competed in the late 1930s
 Pieter Coops (1640–1673), Dutch seasscape painter

See also
 Allerton Coops, historic apartment building complex in the Bronx, New York
 Coop (disambiguation)
 Coopes, surname
 Coope, a surname
 Coop (surname)
 Cooper (surname)